"Sønner av Norge" (originally "Sønner af Norge") is the common title of the song "Norsk Nationalsang", which was the de facto national anthem of Norway from 1820 until the early 20th century. From the mid-1860s, "Ja, vi elsker dette landet" gradually came to occupy the unofficial position as national anthem, but was used alongside "Sønner af Norge" until the early 20th century, with "Sønner af Norge" being preferred in official situations.

History
The lyrics were written by Henrik Anker Bjerregaard (1792–1842) and the melody by Christian Blom (1782–1861), after the Royal Norwegian Society for Development had announced a competition to write a national anthem for Norway in 1819. "Norsk Nationalsang" ("Sønner af Norge") was announced as the winner.

Lyrics

References 

Historical national anthems
Norwegian anthems
National symbols of Norway
1820 songs